KPFC may refer to:

 Keilor Park Football Club
 Kirkley & Pakefield F.C.
 Kiveton Park F.C.
 KPFC (FM), a radio station (91.9 FM) licensed to Callisburg, Texas, United States
 The ICAO identifier for Pacific City State Airport in Pacific City, Oregon, United States